The 1981–82 Philadelphia Flyers season was the Flyers' 15th season in the National Hockey League (NHL). The Flyers lost in the Patrick Division Semifinals to the New York Rangers in four games.

Regular season
The Flyers were unable to reach a long-term contract with team captain Mel Bridgman for the second consecutive off-season. Prior to opening night head coach Pat Quinn replaced Bridgman as captain with Bill Barber. On November 11, Bridgman was traded to the Calgary Flames for defenseman Brad Marsh.

Darryl Sittler was acquired in January from Toronto.

After winning only six games in a span of 29 games, head coach Pat Quinn and assistant coach Bob Boucher were fired on March 19. Bobby Clarke was also relieved of his duties as an assistant coach. Replacing Quinn was Bob McCammon, who had been coaching the Maine Mariners ever since being replaced as Flyers coach by Quinn in 1979.

Season standings

Playoffs
After a third-place finish the Flyers lost in four games to the Rangers in the first round of the playoffs. For the first time in since 1971, they failed to make it past the first round.

Schedule and results

Regular season

|- style="background:#ffc;"
| 1 || October 9 || Detroit Red Wings || 2–2 || 0–0–1 || 1 || 
|- style="background:#cfc;"
| 2 || October 11 || Pittsburgh Penguins || 8–2 || 1–0–1 || 3 || 
|- style="background:#cfc;"
| 3 || October 14 || @ Washington Capitals || 5–4 || 2–0–1 || 5 || 
|- style="background:#cfc;"
| 4 || October 15 || Washington Capitals || 5–2 || 3–0–1 || 7 || 
|- style="background:#cfc;"
| 5 || October 18 || Minnesota North Stars || 3–2 || 4–0–1 || 9 || 
|- style="background:#cfc;"
| 6 || October 22 || Quebec Nordiques || 3–2 || 5–0–1 || 11 || 
|- style="background:#cfc;"
| 7 || October 24 || @ St. Louis Blues || 6–3 || 6–0–1 || 13 || 
|- style="background:#cfc;"
| 8 || October 25 || @ Detroit Red Wings || 4–1 || 7–0–1 || 15 || 
|- style="background:#fcf;"
| 9 || October 27 || @ Montreal Canadiens || 2–11 || 7–1–1 || 15 || 
|- style="background:#cfc;"
| 10 || October 29 || Pittsburgh Penguins || 6–4 || 8–1–1 || 17 || 
|- style="background:#fcf;"
| 11 || October 31 || Vancouver Canucks || 4–8 || 8–2–1 || 17 || 
|-

|- style="background:#fcf;"
| 12 || November 1 || @ Buffalo Sabres || 2–6 || 8–3–1 || 17 || 
|- style="background:#fcf;"
| 13 || November 5 || New York Rangers || 2–6 || 8–4–1 || 17 || 
|- style="background:#fcf;"
| 14 || November 7 || @ Pittsburgh Penguins || 2–7 || 8–5–1 || 17 || 
|- style="background:#cfc;"
| 15 || November 12 || Hartford Whalers || 5–3 || 9–5–1 || 19 || 
|- style="background:#fcf;"
| 16 || November 14 || @ Toronto Maple Leafs || 0–4 || 9–6–1 || 19 || 
|- style="background:#cfc;"
| 17 || November 15 || New York Islanders || 5–4 || 10–6–1 || 21 || 
|- style="background:#fcf;"
| 18 || November 18 || @ New York Rangers || 2–5 || 10–7–1 || 21 || 
|- style="background:#fcf;"
| 19 || November 21 || @ Washington Capitals || 4–10 || 10–8–1 || 21 || 
|- style="background:#fcf;"
| 20 || November 22 || Washington Capitals || 2–3 || 10–9–1 || 21 || 
|- style="background:#cfc;"
| 21 || November 24 || Toronto Maple Leafs || 6–3 || 11–9–1 || 23 || 
|- style="background:#cfc;"
| 22 || November 26 || @ Boston Bruins || 3–1 || 12–9–1 || 25 || 
|- style="background:#fcf;"
| 23 || November 28 || @ Minnesota North Stars || 3–5 || 12–10–1 || 25 || 
|-

|- style="background:#cfc;"
| 24 || December 1 || Winnipeg Jets || 2–1 || 13–10–1 || 27 || 
|- style="background:#cfc;"
| 25 || December 3 || Calgary Flames || 6–1 || 14–10–1 || 29 || 
|- style="background:#cfc;"
| 26 || December 5 || @ Detroit Red Wings || 5–2 || 15–10–1 || 31 || 
|- style="background:#cfc;"
| 27 || December 6 || St. Louis Blues || 8–2 || 16–10–1 || 33 || 
|- style="background:#cfc;"
| 28 || December 9 || @ Pittsburgh Penguins || 4–1 || 17–10–1 || 35 || 
|- style="background:#fcf;"
| 29 || December 12 || New York Rangers || 3–5 || 17–11–1 || 35 || 
|- style="background:#cfc;"
| 30 || December 16 || @ New York Rangers || 7–3 || 18–11–1 || 37 || 
|- style="background:#cfc;"
| 31 || December 17 || Buffalo Sabres || 2–1 || 19–11–1 || 39 || 
|- style="background:#cfc;"
| 32 || December 20 || Pittsburgh Penguins || 3–1 || 20–11–1 || 41 || 
|- style="background:#cfc;"
| 33 || December 23 || @ Chicago Black Hawks || 7–6 || 21–11–1 || 43 || 
|- style="background:#fcf;"
| 34 || December 26 || @ New York Islanders || 2–4 || 21–12–1 || 43 || 
|- style="background:#cfc;"
| 35 || December 28 || @ Calgary Flames || 7–4 || 22–12–1 || 45 || 
|- style="background:#fcf;"
| 36 || December 30 || @ Edmonton Oilers || 5–7 || 22–13–1 || 45 || 
|-

|- style="background:#cfc;"
| 37 || January 2 || @ St. Louis Blues || 5–3 || 23–13–1 || 47 || 
|- style="background:#cfc;"
| 38 || January 5 || Los Angeles Kings || 5–3 || 24–13–1 || 49 || 
|- style="background:#fcf;"
| 39 || January 7 || New York Islanders || 4–5 || 24–14–1 || 49 || 
|- style="background:#fcf;"
| 40 || January 9 || @ New York Islanders || 1–3 || 24–15–1 || 49 || 
|- style="background:#cfc;"
| 41 || January 10 || Colorado Rockies || 5–4 || 25–15–1 || 51 || 
|- style="background:#cfc;"
| 42 || January 14 || Edmonton Oilers || 8–2 || 26–15–1 || 53 || 
|- style="background:#cfc;"
| 43 || January 16 || @ Montreal Canadiens || 4–2 || 27–15–1 || 55 || 
|- style="background:#cfc;"
| 44 || January 17 || Boston Bruins || 7–3 || 28–15–1 || 57 || 
|- style="background:#ffc;"
| 45 || January 19 || @ Quebec Nordiques || 2–2 || 28–15–2 || 58 || 
|- style="background:#fcf;"
| 46 || January 21 || Montreal Canadiens || 2–4 || 28–16–2 || 58 || 
|- style="background:#ffc;"
| 47 || January 23 || @ Pittsburgh Penguins || 5–5 || 28–16–3 || 59 || 
|- style="background:#fcf;"
| 48 || January 26 || @ Colorado Rockies || 4–7 || 28–17–3 || 59 || 
|- style="background:#ffc;"
| 49 || January 27 || @ Los Angeles Kings || 4–4 || 28–17–4 || 60 || 
|- style="background:#fcf;"
| 50 || January 30 || @ Vancouver Canucks || 2–4 || 28–18–4 || 60 || 
|- style="background:#fcf;"
| 51 || January 31 || @ Edmonton Oilers || 4–7 || 28–19–4 || 60 || 
|-

|- style="background:#ffc;"
| 52 || February 4 || Minnesota North Stars || 3–3 || 28–19–5 || 61 || 
|- style="background:#fcf;"
| 53 || February 6 || @ Quebec Nordiques || 3–4 || 28–20–5 || 61 || 
|- style="background:#cfc;"
| 54 || February 7 || Pittsburgh Penguins || 5–4 || 29–20–5 || 63 || 
|- style="background:#cfc;"
| 55 || February 11 || Buffalo Sabres || 6–4 || 30–20–5 || 65 || 
|- style="background:#fcf;"
| 56 || February 13 || @ New York Islanders || 2–8 || 30–21–5 || 65 || 
|- style="background:#cfc;"
| 57 || February 14 || Los Angeles Kings || 6–4 || 31–21–5 || 67 || 
|- style="background:#fcf;"
| 58 || February 18 || New York Islanders || 4–7 || 31–22–5 || 67 || 
|- style="background:#fcf;"
| 59 || February 20 || @ Pittsburgh Penguins || 5–6 || 31–23–5 || 67 || 
|- style="background:#fcf;"
| 60 || February 21 || Boston Bruins || 0–1 || 31–24–5 || 67 || 
|- style="background:#fcf;"
| 61 || February 24 || @ Winnipeg Jets || 2–6 || 31–25–5 || 67 || 
|- style="background:#cfc;"
| 62 || February 27 || @ Calgary Flames || 9–8 || 32–25–5 || 69 || 
|- style="background:#ffc;"
| 63 || February 28 || @ Vancouver Canucks || 3–3 || 32–25–6 || 70 || 
|-

|- style="background:#fcf;"
| 64 || March 2 || Winnipeg Jets || 6–7 || 32–26–6 || 70 || 
|- style="background:#ffc;"
| 65 || March 4 || New York Rangers || 4–4 || 32–26–7 || 71 || 
|- style="background:#fcf;"
| 66 || March 6 || @ Chicago Black Hawks || 1–4 || 32–27–7 || 71 || 
|- style="background:#cfc;"
| 67 || March 7 || Washington Capitals || 7–1 || 33–27–7 || 73 || 
|- style="background:#ffc;"
| 68 || March 10 || @ New York Rangers || 5–5 || 33–27–8 || 74 || 
|- style="background:#cfc;"
| 69 || March 11 || Colorado Rockies || 5–1 || 34–27–8 || 76 || 
|- style="background:#fcf;"
| 70 || March 13 || @ Washington Capitals || 3–6 || 34–28–8 || 76 || 
|- style="background:#fcf;"
| 71 || March 17 || @ New York Rangers || 2–5 || 34–29–8 || 76 || 
|- style="background:#ffc;"
| 72 || March 18 || Chicago Black Hawks || 4–4 || 34–29–9 || 77 || 
|- style="background:#cfc;"
| 73 || March 20 || @ Hartford Whalers || 5–2 || 35–29–9 || 79 || 
|- style="background:#cfc;"
| 74 || March 21 || Hartford Whalers || 5–3 || 36–29–9 || 81 || 
|- style="background:#fcf;"
| 75 || March 25 || Washington Capitals || 3–4 || 36–30–9 || 81 || 
|- style="background:#ffc;"
| 76 || March 27 || @ Washington Capitals || 4–4 || 36–30–10 || 82 || 
|- style="background:#cfc;"
| 77 || March 28 || New York Rangers || 3–1 || 37–30–10 || 84 || 
|-

|- style="background:#ffc;"
| 78 || April 1 || New York Islanders || 3–3 || 37–30–11 || 85 || 
|- style="background:#fcf;"
| 79 || April 3 || @ New York Islanders || 3–6 || 37–31–11 || 85 || 
|- style="background:#cfc;"
| 80 || April 4 || Toronto Maple Leafs || 7–1 || 38–31–11 || 87 || 
|-

|-
| Legend:

Playoffs

|- style="background:#cfc;"
| 1 || April 7 || @ New York Rangers || 4–1 || Flyers lead 1–0 || 
|- style="background:#fcf;"
| 2 || April 8 || @ New York Rangers || 3–7 || Series tied 1–1 || 
|- style="background:#fcf;"
| 3 || April 10 || New York Rangers || 3–4 || Rangers lead 2–1 || 
|- style="background:#fcf;"
| 4 || April 11 || New York Rangers || 5–7 || Rangers win 3–1 || 
|-

|-
| Legend:

Player statistics

Scoring
 Position abbreviations: C = Center; D = Defense; G = Goaltender; LW = Left Wing; RW = Right Wing
  = Joined team via a transaction (e.g., trade, waivers, signing) during the season. Stats reflect time with the Flyers only.
  = Left team via a transaction (e.g., trade, waivers, release) during the season. Stats reflect time with the Flyers only.

Goaltending

Awards and records

Awards

Records

Among the team records set during the 1981–82 season was the one minute and twenty-two seconds it took to score the fastest four goals in team history on October 11. Ron Flockhart set two records during the season. On December 6, Flockhart scored two goals eight seconds apart, the fastest two goals by one player in team history. From February 4 to February 20, Flockhart went eight consecutive games with a goal, the longest such streak for a rookie in team history. The Flyers set the franchise season marks for most powerplay goals allowed (102) and tied the mark for fewest shutouts (0).

Milestones

Transactions
The Flyers were involved in the following transactions from May 22, 1981, the day after the deciding game of the 1981 Stanley Cup Finals, through May 16, 1982, the day of the deciding game of the 1982 Stanley Cup Finals.

Trades

Players acquired

Players lost

Signings

Draft picks

Philadelphia's picks at the 1981 NHL Entry Draft, which was held at the Montreal Forum in Montreal, Quebec, on June 10, 1981.

Farm teams
The Flyers were affiliated with the Maine Mariners of the AHL and the Toledo Goaldiggers of the IHL.

Notes

References
General
 
 
 
Specific

Philadelphia Flyers seasons
Philadelphia
Philadelphia
Philadelphia
Philadelphia